James Edward Harris, 5th Earl of Malmesbury DL (18 December 1872 – 12 June 1950), styled Viscount FitzHarris from 1889 to 1899, was a British peer and conservative politician.

Malmesbury was the eldest son of Edward Harris, 4th Earl of Malmesbury, and succeeded in the earldom in 1899. Through his grandmother Emma Wylly Chambers he was a descendant of David Mathews, the Loyalist Mayor of New York City during the American Revolutionary War and a descendant of the American Dutch Schuyler family.

He was Assistant Private Secretary (unpaid) to the Under-Secretary of State for the Colonies, the Earl of Onslow, in 1901, and a member of the London County Council from 1904 to 1905. Between 1922 and 1924 he served as a Lord-in-waiting (government whip in the House of Lords) under Bonar Law and then Stanley Baldwin. He then returned to local politics and was Chairman of the Hampshire County Council from 1927 to 1937.

He held a commission as a militia officer in the 3rd battalion, Royal Hampshire Regiment, where he received the rank of captain on 3 May 1899. Her resigned this commission in December 1902.

Lord Malmesbury married Dorothy Gough-Calthorpe, daughter of Augustus Gough-Calthorpe, 6th Baron Calthorpe, on 27 April 1905. They had two children:

Lady Elizabeth Harris (b. 8 January 1906), married John Fremantle, 4th Baron Cottesloe and had issue.
William James Harris, 6th Earl of Malmesbury (1907–2000)

Lord Malmesbury died in June 1950, aged 77, and was succeeded in the earldom by his only son William.

References

 
James Edward Harris, 5th Earl of Malmesbury, thePeerage.com

1872 births
1950 deaths
British people of Dutch descent
Conservative Party (UK) Baronesses- and Lords-in-Waiting
Deputy Lieutenants of Hampshire
5
Members of London County Council
Schuyler family